Micanopy is a town in Alachua County, Florida, United States, located south of Gainesville. The population as of the 2010 census was 600. The oldest community in the interior of Florida that has been continually inhabited, it has a downtown that is designated as the Micanopy Historic District and listed on the National Register of Historic Places. It contains a number of antique stores, as well as several restaurants, a library, firehouse, and post office. The town's unofficial slogan is "The Town that Time Forgot."

History

In 1774 the American naturalist William Bartram recorded his impressions of a proto-Seminole village named Cuscowilla -- along with its chief, Cowkeeper or Ahaya -- located in the same vicinity as the modern town.

By the time Spain ceded its Florida provinces to the U.S. in 1821, the newly constructed hamlet of Micanopy became the first distinct United States town in the Florida Territory. One of the founders was Moses Elias Levy, a wealthy Jewish businessman and philanthropist who was involved in West Indies shipping and other interests. He immigrated to the United States in 1820 and founded "Pilgrimage", the first Jewish communal settlement in the United States located two miles from town.

The village of Micanopy was built under the auspices of the Florida Association of New York (the earliest Florida development corporation, headquartered in Manhattan). In 1821, when the territorial village was developed, a faction of Miccosukee Indians lived in the immediate area. The historian C. S. Monaco has suggested that the town was named after Micanopy "to appease the chief and acknowledge his original authority over the land." In the early days, the frontier village was sometimes referred to as "Wantons," after one of the original settlers. 

Both Fort Defiance (1835–1836) and Fort Micanopy (1837–1843) were located here during the Second Seminole War. Some of the bloodiest battles of that war took place along the road southwest from Fort Micanopy to Fort Wacahoota, just inside modern Alachua County. A recent archaeological study has verified both forts as well as the location of two battlefields within the town limits: the Battle of Micanopy and the Battle of Welika Pond (1836).

Prior to the 1880s, produce from Micanopy, including citrus, was carried to the southern shore of Lake Alachua and taken by boat to the northern shore, which was served by branch lines from the Transit Railroad. In 1883, the Florida Southern Railway built a branch line to Micanopy from its line running from Rochelle (southeast of Gainesville) to Ocala. In 1895, a rail line was laid from Micanopy by the Gainesville and Gulf Railroad, and by 1889 reached to Irvine and Fairfield in Marion County, and Sampson City in Bradford County, where it connected to the Atlantic, Suwannee River and Gulf Railway and the Georgia Southern and Florida Railroad. The railroads spurred farming in the surrounding area. It had a population of over 600 in 1880. In the 1920s, cars crossed Paynes Prairie on the Micanopy Causeway.

Describing driving route from High Springs to Orlando in 1947, the fifth printing of the Florida guide, published by the Federal Writers' Project, describes Micanopy as "a village of old brick and frame buildings... surrounded by large oaks, lofty cabbage palms, and pecan groves. The first citrus trees of the route appear here, and the landscape assumes a more tropical aspect."

Micanopy's downtown was listed on the National Register of Historic Places in 1983. The home of Marjorie Kinnan Rawlings, where she wrote The Yearling and Cross Creek, is in nearby Cross Creek. The house is operated as a museum.

Demographics

As of the census of 2000, there were 653 people, 302 households, and 172 families residing in the town. The racial makeup of the town was 68.30% White, 28.94% African American, 0.61% Native American, 0.31% Asian, 0.31% from other races, and 1.53% from two or more races. Hispanic or Latino of any race were 1.99% of the population.

There were 302 households, out of which 21.5% had children under the age of 18 living with them, 36.8% were married couples living together, 15.6% had a female householder with no husband present, and 43.0% were non-families. 35.4% of all households were made up of individuals, and 12.9% had someone living alone who was 65 years of age or older. The average household size was 2.16 and the average family size was 2.74.

In the town, the population was spread out, with 19.8% under the age of 18, 4.7% from 18 to 24, 29.6% from 25 to 44, 31.7% from 45 to 64, and 14.2% who were 65 years of age or older. The median age was 43 years. For every 100 females, there were 94.9 males. For every 100 females age 18 and over, there were 85.8 males.

The median income for a household in the town was $27,778, and the median income for a family was $38,611. Males had a median income of $30,938 versus $20,294 for females. The per capita income for the town was $20,433. About 3.0% of families and 15.7% of the population were below the poverty line, including 17.8% of those under age 18 and 21.3% of those age 65 or over.

Education

Micanopy is served by the School Board of Alachua County. The School Board charters two schools, the Micanopy Area Cooperative School (elementary), and Micanopy Academy (secondary).

The Alachua County Library District operates a branch library in the town.

Culture
Micanopy hosts a large art festival every autumn.  The festival features many artists, both local and distant. The festival brings in crowds much larger than the town's population from across Payne's Prairie in Gainesville and surrounding areas. The festival, which is set on the town’s main street, offers more than art.  The event also offers kettle corn, honey, and many different varieties of food. Additionally, the festival features artwork, hand-crafted gifts, and handmade jewelry. The festival is dog friendly.

Micanopy Historical Society Museum features displays showing area and town history, from the early Native Americans through the Seminole Wars, naturalist William Bartram’s travels in the region, and the Civil War. It is located downtown in the historic Thrasher Warehouse, a building that was placed on the National Register of Historic Places in 1983. Constructed in 1896, the Thrasher Warehouse was served by a branch of the Atlantic Coast Line Railroad until the 1950's.

The town hosts a sub-committee of the Alachua County Truth and Reconciliation Initiative which seeks to set an example for how local government can recall its role in our history of racial injustice, and repair what it can through official apologies and appropriate reparations.

Micanopy lies adjacent to several nature preserves: Paynes Prairie Preserve State Park to the north is a Florida State Park that encompasses a 21,000-acre savanna, Tuscawilla Preserve to the south includes a prairie and adjacent uplands with small creeks and mesic forests. Adjacent to the north of Tuscawilla Preserve is the Native American Heritage Preserve. Barr Hammock Preserve lies to the west of Micanopy.

In popular culture
Micanopy is mentioned in the Tom Petty song "A Mind with a Heart of Its Own" from the album Full Moon Fever. Petty sings that he's "been to Brooker, been to Micanopy, been to St. Louis too, I've been all around the world!".

In Tony Harrison’s "A Kumquat for John Keats", the great British poet and playwright weaves together the threads of his own life, those of Keats and the taste and sensation of eating kumquats in Micanopy, where he lived in 1979.
"and if John Keats had only lived to be,

because of extra years, in need like me,

at 42 he'd help me celebrate

that Micanopy kumquat that I ate ..." 
Micanopy is noted in the chorus of the John Anderson song "Seminole Wind" from the album Seminole Wind. The song is covered by James Taylor on the album James Taylor Covers.

The film Doc Hollywood, based on the book What, Dead Again? by Neil B. Shulman and starring Michael J. Fox, was filmed in Micanopy.

Notable people

 Archie Carr, zoologist and author, and his wife Marjorie Harris Carr, also a conservationist. They lived at Wewa Pond just outside Micanopy
 Stephen F. Eisenman, art historian, critic, columnist (Counterpunch) and environmentalist 
 John Horse, Black Seminole leader, lived here before the Seminole Wars and removal to Indian Territory
 Moses Elias Levy, wealthy businessman and philanthropist, founded Pilgrimage and Micanopy
 River Phoenix, actor, cremated ashes scattered here at family ranch

Gallery

Micanopy Historic District

See also

 Church of the Mediator

References

External links

 Town of Micanopy official website
 Cotton States newspaper that serves Micanopy, Florida is available in full-text with images in Florida Digital Newspaper Library
 Micanopy Branch Library
 Welcome to Micanopy, commercial website
 Micanopy Historical Society
 Article on Micanopy from the Florida Historical Society

1821 establishments in Florida Territory
Gainesville metropolitan area, Florida
Populated places established in 1821
Seminole
Towns in Alachua County, Florida
Towns in Florida